Industrious is an American company that provides co-working spaces to companies and individuals. It was founded in 2012 and operates in more than 150 locations — and 65+ cities — across the U.S. and abroad.

History 
Industrious was founded by Jamie Hodari and Justin Stewart in 2012 when they lacked an adequately professional co-working space. The duo raised US$1 million from 80 investors and opened the first Industrious center in Chicago in 2013.

In April 2019, Industrious turned to malls and opened centers at the mall at Fashion Square in Scottsdale, Arizona, Short Hills mall in New Jersey and Broadway Plaza in Walnut Creek, California. In February 2021, the company opened its ninth center in NYC at Midtown's Carnegie Hall Tower. It also provides Club 135 by Industrious, an amenity center at 135 West 50th Street in New York City. In October 2020, it opened its eighth center in Chicago at Blackstone Group's Willis Tower.

In August 2019, the company raised US$80 million in Series D funding making the total investment to US$220 million led by Brookfield Property Partners and Canada Pension Plan. In February 2021, Dallas-based CBRE Group Inc. invested US$200 million to take a 35% stake in Industrious and also transferred its own flexible workspace brand Hana, which operates 10 locations in the U.S. and U.K., to Industrious as part of the transaction.

Partnerships 

Industrious partners with the fitness company Equinox and Wythe Hotel to provide co-working spaces in popular locations. The company also partners with Cushman and Wakefield to provide a service called Integrated Building Management that incorporates flexible office and hospitality-driven amenitization into a unified approach to property management.

Acquisitions 

Industrious acquired the digital flexible workplace platform, PivotDesk in 2017 and TechSpace, an office-space provider for tech-related companies in May 2019.

Operations 

Since 2018, Industrious also focuses on landlord partnerships for expansion and offers space as a service to corporate clients. Industrious has a collaborative business model wherein the company gets a management fee and shares profit with landlords.

References

External links 
 

Companies established in 2012
Coworking space providers